Amran Said Juma Kharbash Al-Hidi (born 7 April 1998) is an Omani footballer who plays for Suwaiq Club and the Omani national team.

He debuted internationally on 5 September 2019, during the 2022 FIFA World Cup qualification match in a 1–2 victory against India.

On 14 November 2019, Al-Hidi scored his first goal in a major competition for Oman against Bangladesh in a 4–1 victory.

International goals

References

External links
 

Living people
1998 births
Omani footballers
Oman international footballers
Association football midfielders
Suwaiq Club players
Oman Professional League players
People from Saham